The 2012–13 Greek Basket League was the 73rd season of the Greek Basket League, the highest tier professional basketball league in Greece.

Teams

Regular season

Standings 

Pts=Points, Pld=Matches played, W=Matches won, L=Matches lost, F=Points for, A=Points against, D=Points difference

Playoffs 
Teams in bold won the playoff series. Numbers to the left of each team indicate the team's original playoff seeding. Numbers to the right indicate the score of each playoff game.

Bracket 

The game was stopped with 1:27 left in the fourth quarter due to flares, firecrackers, and objects that were thrown onto the court by Olympiacos fans. At that moment, Panathinaikos led the game by a score of 72–76. The referees stopped the game temporarily, and ordered the fans to exit the arena. However, about 120 Olympiacos fans stayed behind the VIP stands and refused to leave the arena. That led to the referees cancelling the game, and giving a technicality win to Panathinaikos, by a score of 0-20.

2012–13 Greek Basket League Finals
The defending Greek Basket League champions, Olympiacos, finished first in the regular season, and faced their arch-rivals Panathinaikos, in the finals of the playoffs, having home-court advantage. Despite the home court advantage, Panathinaikos won the series 3–0, by performing a "clean sweep", after defeating Olympiacos twice at their home-court. The 3rd game was disrupted by Olympiacos fans throwing flash-grenades at Panathinaikos' bench, when the score was 72–76 with 01:27 left to go in the game.

The match officials decided to stop the game, and have the stadium cleared of all fans. 75 minutes went by, and 100+ Olympiacos fans had still not vacated the stadium, so the game and the series was officially called off. A technicality win of 0-20 was granted to Panathinaikos, despite there still being 01:27 left on the game clock.

The events of the 3rd game of the series, happened after the owner of Panathinaikos, Dimitrios Giannakopoulos, and three other men, entered into the referee locker room at the home arena of Panathinaikos, OAKA, during halftime of the 2nd game of the series. Giannakopoulos reportedly told the refs that they would not leave the arena, if they did not change how they were calling the game, with Panathinaikos behind in the score at halftime. Giannkopoulos was later sanctioned by the Greek sports prosecutor for these actions. Giannakopoulos was then banned from entering into any arenas in Greece by the Greek Committee of Sportsmanship, for a period of 6 months, however, he was placed on 3 years of probation and given a suspended sentence. He was however, suspended from entering into the arenas at his own team's games, for a period of 3 months time.

Final league standings

Stats leaders 

Greek Basket League stats leaders are counted by totals, rather than averages, and include both regular season and playoff games.

Points

Rebounds

Assists

Steals

Blocks

Ranking

Economy

Awards

MVP
 Stephane Lasme – Panathinaikos

Finals MVP
 Stéphane Lasme – Panathinaikos

Most Improved Player
 Vlado Janković – Panionios

Best Defender
 Stephane Lasme – Panathinaikos

Best Young Player
  Sasha Vezenkov – Aris

Best Coach
 Argyris Pedoulakis – Panathinaikos

References

External links 
 Official Basket League Site 
 Official Basket League Site 
 Official Hellenic Basketball Federation Site 

Greek Basket League seasons
1
Greek